Golestaneh (also Romanized as Golestāneh; also known as Golestān, Golestānābād, and Gulistanabad) is a village in Bonab Rural District, in the Central District of Zanjan County, Zanjan Province, Iran. At the 2006 census, its population was 48, in 12 families.

References 

Populated places in Zanjan County